Sandra Nikčević (Montenegrin Cyrillic: Сандра Никчевић, born 16 November 1984) is a Montenegrin handballer, who plays for Osmangazi Belediyespor in Turkey. She is also part of the Montenegro international setup.

She was in Croatia with RK Podravka Vegeta (2010–11), in Hungary with Alcoa FKC (2011–12) and Ipress Center-Vác (2013–14), in Russia with HC Astrakhanochka (2012–13) before she moved to Turkey to play in the 2011–12 season of the Turkish Women's Handball Super League for the Rize-based Ardeşen GSK. In August 2015, she transferred to Osmangazi Belediyespor in Bursa.

Achievements
Croatian Championship:
Winner: 2011
Croatian Cup:
Winner: 2011
European Championship:
Winner: 2012

References

1984 births
Living people
Sportspeople from Podgorica
Montenegrin female handball players
Montenegrin expatriate sportspeople in Croatia
Montenegrin expatriate sportspeople in Hungary
Montenegrin expatriate sportspeople in Russia
Montenegrin expatriate sportspeople in Turkey
Expatriate handball players in Turkey
Fehérvár KC players
Ardeşen GSK players
RK Podravka Koprivnica players